Golen may refer to:

 Goleń, Warmian-Masurian Voivodeship, Poland
 Golen Gol Hydropower Project, Pakistan
 Cwrt Y Golen or Cwrt y Gollen, a British Army training base south-east of Crickhowell, Wales
 Ralph Golen (born 1970), Polish-born Canadian footballer

See also